Orange County International Auto Show is an annual event in Anaheim, California, that has been held since 1996.  The show runs at the Anaheim Convention Center. In 2006 the former California International Auto Show has announced its name will change to the "Orange County International Auto Show". The show is presented by the Orange County Automobile Dealers Association.

This show went on hiatus in 2020.

2013
Mercedes Benz S-Class Sedan
BMW i3 Coupe
Nissan Rogue SUV
Chevrolet Tahoe SUV
GMC Yukon SUV
Chevrolet Corvette Stingray

2012

 Acura NSX 'The Avengers' Concept
 Honda Accord Sedan
 Honda Accord Coupe

2011

 Acura TSX Special Edition 
 Honda CR-V Concept

2010

 Ford Explorer

2009

 Acura ZDX

2006

 Nissan Altima Hybrid
 Suzuki "Hip Hop" Grand Vitara Concept

2005

 GMC Yukon
 GMC Yukon Denali
 Suzuki Grand Vitara 5-door
 Suzuki "Blizzard" Grand Vitara Concept
 Suzuki "Sea" Forenza Wagon Concept
 Saturn VUE Red Line

2004

 Hummer H1 Alpha Convertible
 Hummer H3 
 Pontiac Grand Prix
 Saleen S281

1998

 Buick Century (facelift)
 Buick Regal (facelift)
 Cadillac Escalade 
 Chevrolet Tracker
 Chevrolet Tracker Convertible
 Dodge Grand Caravan ES
 Ford Explorer XSL
 Lincoln LS
 Mercury Mountaineer
 Mercury Villager
 Oldsmobile Silhouette Premiere Edition
 Saturn SL (facelift)
 Saturn SL2 (facelift)

References

External links
 

Auto shows in the United States
Annual events in California
Tourist attractions in Orange County, California